In the study of differential equations, the Loewy decomposition breaks every linear ordinary differential equation (ODE) into what are called largest completely reducible components. It was introduced by Alfred Loewy.

Solving differential equations is one of the most important subfields in mathematics. Of particular interest are solutions in closed form. Breaking ODEs into largest irreducible components, reduces the process of solving the original equation to solving irreducible equations of lowest possible order. This procedure is algorithmic, so that the best possible answer for solving a reducible equation is guaranteed. A detailed discussion may be found in.

Loewy's results have been extended to linear partial differential equations (PDEs) in two independent variables. In this way, algorithmic methods for solving large classes of linear PDEs have become available.

Decomposing linear ordinary differential equations 
Let  denote the derivative with respect to the variable .
A differential operator of order  is a polynomial of the form

Usually it is the field of rational functions in the variable , i.e. .

If an operator does not allow any right factor it is called irreducible.

For any two operators  and  the least common left multiple  is the operator of lowest order such that both  and  divide it from the right. By definition, an irreducible operator is called completely reducible.

Due to the lowering of order in each step, this proceeding terminates after a finite number of iterations and the desired decomposition is obtained. Based on these considerations, Loewy  obtained the following fundamental result.

It provides a detailed description of the function space containing the solution of a reducible linear differential equation .

For operators of fixed order the possible Loewy decompositions, differing by the number and the order of factors, may be listed explicitly; some of the factors may contain parameters. Each alternative is called a type of Loewy decomposition.

Corollary 1
Let  be a second-order operator.

An irreducible second-order operator is defined to have decomposition type .

If a decomposition of type ,  or  has been obtained for a
second-order equation , a fundamental system may be given explicitly.

Corollary 2

Here two rational functions  are called equivalent if there exists another rational function  such that 

There remains the question how to obtain a factorization for a given equation or operator. It turns out that for linear ode's finding the factors comes down to determining rational solutions of Riccati equations or linear ode's; both may be determined algorithmically. The two examples below show how the above corollary is applied.

Example 1
Equation 2.201 from Kamke's collection. has the  decomposition

Example 2
An equation with a type  decomposition is

These results show that factorization provides an algorithmic scheme for solving reducible linear ode's. Whenever an equation of order 2 factorizes according to one of the types defined above the elements of a fundamental system are explicitly known, i.e. factorization is equivalent to solving it.

A similar scheme may be set up for linear ode's of any order, although the number of alternatives grows considerably with the order; for order  the answer is given in full detail in.

If an equation is irreducible it may occur that its Galois group is nontrivial, then algebraic solutions may exist. If the Galois group is trivial it may be possible to express the solutions in terms of special function like e.g. Bessel or Legendre functions, see  or.

Basic facts from differential algebra 
In order to generalize Loewy's result to linear PDEs it is necessary to apply the more general setting of differential algebra. Therefore, a few basic concepts that are required for this purpose are given next.

A field  is called a differential field if it is equipped with a derivation operator. A field with a single derivation operator is called an ordinary differential field; if there is a finite set containing several commuting derivation operators the field is called a partial differential field.

Its elements have the form ; almost all coefficients  are zero. The coefficient field is called the base field. The ring  is non-commutative,  and similarly for the other variables;  is from the base field.

For an operator  of order  the symbol of L is the homogeneous algebraic polynomial  where  and  algebraic indeterminates.

Then one writes . Because right ideals are not considered here, sometimes  is simply called an ideal.

The elements  are applied to a single differential indeterminate . In this way the ideal  corresponds to the system of PDEs ,  for the single function .

The generators of an ideal are highly non-unique; its members may be transformed in infinitely many ways by taking linear combinations of them or its derivatives without changing the ideal. Therefore, M. Janet introduced a normal form for systems of linear PDEs (see Janet basis). They are the differential analog to Gröbner bases of commutative algebra (which were originally introduced by Bruno Buchberger); therefore they are also sometimes called differential Gröbner basis.

In order to generate a Janet basis, a ranking of derivatives must be defined. Here graded lexicographic term orderings  are applied. For partial derivatives of a single function their definition is analogous to the monomial orderings in commutative algebra. The S-pairs in commutative algebra correspond to the integrability conditions.

If it is assured that the generators  of an ideal  form a Janet basis the notation  is applied.

Example 3
Consider the ideal

Its generators are autoreduced. If the integrability condition

Its generators are autoreduced and the single integrability condition is satisfied, i.e. they form a Janet basis.

In general, a divisor in a ring of partial differential operators need not be principal.

A special kind of divisor is the so-called Laplace divisor of a given operator , page 34. It is defined as follows.

Definition
Let  be a partial differential operator in the plane; define

and

Assume the coefficients ,  are such that  and  form a Janet basis.

In order for a Laplace divisor to exist the coeffients of an operator  must obey certain constraints. An algorithm for determining an upper bound for a Laplace divisor is not known at present, therefore in general the existence of a Laplace divisor may be undecidable.

Decomposing second-order linear partial differential equations in the plane 

Applying the above concepts Loewy's theory may be generalized to linear PDEs.

Second-order equations have been considered extensively in the literature of the 19th century,. Their general solutions contain not only constants but undetermined functions of varying numbers of arguments; determining them is part of the solution procedure. For equations with leading derivative  Loewy's results may be generalized as follows.

Theorem 2
Let the differential operator  be defined by
 where  for all .

Then  has a Loewy decomposition according to one of the following types.

If  does not have any first-order factor in the base field, its decomposition type is defined to be .

In order to apply this result for solving any given differential equation involving the operator  the question arises whether its first-order factors may be determined algorithmically. The subsequent corollary provides the answer for factors with coefficients either in the base field or a universal field extension.

Corollary 3
In general, first-order right factors of a linear pde in the base field cannot be determined algorithmically. If the symbol polynomial is separable any factor may be determined. If it has a double root in general it is not possible to determine the right factors in the base field. The existence of factors in a universal field, i.e. absolute irreducibility, may always be decided.

The above theorem may be applied for solving reducible equations in closed form. Because there are only principal divisors involved the answer is similar as for ordinary second-order equations.

Proposition 1
Let a reducible second-order equation  where .

Furthermore, define

A differential fundamental system has the following structure for the various decompositions into first-order components.

to exist. In general , they are determined

A typical example of a linear pde where factorization applies is an equation that has been discussed by Forsyth, vol. VI, page 16,

Example 5 (Forsyth 1906)
Consider the differential equation . Upon factorization the representation

is obtained. There follows

Consequently, a differential fundamental system is

involving only principal divisors may be described as follows.

Theorem 3
Let the differential operator  be defined by
 where  for all .

The decomposition of type  is completely reducible

In addition there are five more possible decomposition types involving non-principal Laplace divisors as shown next.

Theorem 4
Let the differential operator  be defined by
 where  for all .

If  does not have a first order right factor and it may be shown that a Laplace divisor does not exist its decomposition type is defined to be .

An equation that does not allow a decomposition involving principal divisors but is completely reducible with respect to non-principal Laplace divisors of type  has been considered by Forsyth.

Example 6 (Forsyth 1906) Define

generating the principal ideal . A first-order factor does not exist. However, there are Laplace divisors
 and 

Therefore, the equation  has the differential fundamental system
 and

Decomposing linear PDEs of order higher than 2 

It turns out that operators of higher order have more complicated decompositions and there are more alternatives, many of them in terms of non-principal divisors. The solutions of the corresponding equations get more complex. For equations of order three in the plane a fairly complete answer may be found in. A typical example of a third-order equation that is also of historical interest is due to Blumberg.

Example 7 (Blumberg 1912)
In his dissertation Blumberg considered the third order operator

Their intersection is not principal; defining

Consequently, the Loewy decomposition of Blumbergs's operator is

It yields the following differential fundamental system for the differential equation .

,
,

Factorizations and Loewy decompositions turned out to be an extremely useful method for determining solutions of linear differential equations in closed form, both for ordinary and partial equations. It should be possible to generalize these methods to equations of higher order, equations in more variables and system of differential equations.

References 

Differential equations